Daniel Ross (born 1970) is an Australian philosopher and filmmaker, best known as the author of Violent Democracy (2004) and the co-director of the film The Ister (2004). His work is influenced by Bernard Stiegler, and he is a translator or co-translator of numerous texts by Stiegler, including eleven books.

Education 
Ross obtained his doctorate from Monash University in 2002, under the supervision of Michael Janover. It was entitled Heidegger and the Question of the Political and focused in particular on two of Heidegger's lecture courses, Plato's Sophist and Hölderlin's Hymn "The Ister".

Filmography 
The Ister (2004). Co-directed with David Barison.

Bibliography

Books 
Psychopolitical Anaphylaxis: Steps Towards a Metacosmics (London: Open Humanities Press, 2021). 
Violent Democracy (Cambridge: Cambridge University Press, 2004).

Thesis 
Heidegger and the Question of the Political (2002).

External links 
Daniel Ross on academia.edu.
.

1970 births
21st-century Australian non-fiction writers
21st-century Australian philosophers
21st-century translators
Australian documentary filmmakers
Australian film directors
Australian male non-fiction writers
Australian non-fiction writers
Australian translators
Historians of philosophy
Living people
Monash University alumni
Philosophers of art
Philosophers of culture
Philosophers of education
Philosophers of history
Philosophers of mind
Political philosophers
Social philosophers
Philosophers of technology
Continental philosophers